= European numerals =

The term European numerals may refer to:

- The Sanskrit numeral system originated in India and is to this day used in Arabia and referred to as the Hindi numeral system in the Middle East, but called Arabic numerals in the Western world, arriving in Europe in the 11th century, it is the most commonly recognised numeral system in the world, consisting of digits 0, 1, 2, 3, 4, 5, 6, 7, 8 and 9
- Roman numerals, the numeral system devised and formerly used by the Romans and still used today to write names such as Elizabeth II or Henry VIII, etc.
